Archibald Cargill (20 August 1853 – 18 July 1926) was a New Zealand cricketer. He played four first-class matches for Otago between 1876 and 1884.

Cargill was born at Melbourne in Victoria, Australia in 1853. He married in 1883. He worked as an accountant with the National Insurance Company in Dunedin for 21 years before being dismissed in 1898 and prosecuted for embezzlement totalling 10 pounds 10 shillings. In 1910, while working as an accountant in Wellington, he slipped while alighting from a train near his home in Lower Hutt, fell onto the tracks, and was so badly injured by the train that one of his legs had to be amputated below the knee.

References

External links
 

1853 births
1926 deaths
New Zealand cricketers
Otago cricketers
Cricketers from Melbourne